The Purple Lady is a lost 1916 American silent comedy film. Directed by George A. Lessey, the film stars Ralph Herz, Irene Howley, and Alan Hale. It was released on June 26, 1916.

Cast list
 Ralph C. Herz as Silas Gilworthy
Irene Howley as Fifi Melotte
 Alan Hale as Count Louis Petelier
 Howard Truesdale as Mr. Severn
 George Pauncefote as Detective Rogers
 Guido Colucci as Jules Bergere
 Gretchen Hartman as Adelaide Severn
 Mrs. William Bechtel as Mrs. Severn
 Cora Williams as Mrs. Rogers

References

External links
'' The Purple Lady at IMDb.com

American silent feature films
American black-and-white films
Silent American comedy films
1916 comedy films
1916 films
Metro Pictures films
1910s English-language films
1910s American films